Aliti Namoce (born 31 December 1997) is a Fijian rugby league footballer who plays for the St George Illawarra Dragons in the NSWRL Women's Premiership.

Background
Born in Fiji, Namoce grew up in Blacktown, New South Wales and attended Seven Hills High School, where she played rugby union.

Playing career
In 2019, Namoce began playing rugby league for the North Sydney Bears in the NSWRL Women's Premiership.

In June 2019, she represented NSW City at the Women's National Championships. On 22 June 2019, she was selected as 18th player for Fiji in their 28–0 win over Papua New Guinea.

On 1 July 2019, she signed with the Sydney Roosters NRL Women's Premiership team. In Round 1 of the 2019 NRL Women's season, she made her debut for the Roosters in their 12–16 win over the New Zealand Warriors.

References

External links
NRL profile
Dragons profile

1997 births
Living people
Fijian female rugby league players
Rugby league props
Sydney Roosters (NRLW) players
St. George Illawarra Dragons (NRLW) players